is a Japanese politician of the Liberal Democratic Party (LDP), a member of the House of Representatives in the Diet (national legislature).

Background and career
A native of Tokyo and graduate of the University of Tokyo he joined the Ministry of Finance in 1964. In 1972 when his father-in-law Takeo Noda died, he left the ministry to run for Takeo Noda's seat and was elected for the first time. Later, he served as the Minister of Construction in 1989 (Uno Cabinet), Minister of State for Economic and Fiscal Policy (Miyazawa Cabinet), Minister of Home Affairs(Obichi Cabinet), Chairman, General Assembly of Party Members of the House of Representatives of LDP.

Positions regarding key issues
Noda, who is affiliated to the openly revisionist lobby Nippon Kaigi, gave the following answers to the questionnaire submitted to lawmakers by Mainichi in 2012:
in favor of the revision of the constitution
in favor of collective-self-defense (which implies a revision of the Article 9)
in favor of the reform to a unicameral legislative system
in favor of a strong stance versus China
the possibility of a nuclear-armed Japan should be considered in the future
in favor of the reactivation of nuclear plants, against the goal of zero-nuclear energy by 2030
against the reform of the Imperial Household that would allow women to retain their Imperial status even after marriage
in favor of relocating the US Marine Corps Air Station Futenma in Okinawa
against the Trans-Pacific Partnership

Noda is also the chairman of the pro-tobacco lobby in the Japanese Diet:

References

External links 
  in Japanese.

1941 births
Living people
People from Kumamoto
University of Tokyo alumni
Members of the House of Representatives (Japan)
Members of Nippon Kaigi
Ministers of Construction of Japan
Liberal Democratic Party (Japan) politicians